Monstrous is a 2022 American supernatural thriller film directed by Chris Sivertson, written by Carol Chrest, and starring Christina Ricci. The film premiered at the Glasgow Film Festival on March 12, 2022. It was released in the United States on May 13, 2022, by Screen Media.

Plot
In the 1950s, Laura and her seven-year-old son, Cody, drive to a remote home in California to flee from her abusive ex-husband. The family is threatened by the possibility of his return as well as the presence of a monster lurking in a nearby lake.

They settle in, she sends her son to school, makes lunch for him and works at a company doing a typing job. Her son seems frightened because some entity from the nearby lake lurks around his room at night. But after a direct encounter with that monster he seems comfortable with it and calls it "pretty lady from the lake". But still he wants to go home, he always seems sad and depressed and argues with his mom to go back. But she always refuses. On his birthday she arranges a party and makes invitations for his classmates. But he says no one will come, even when she insists that he should at least give it a chance. Both of them decorate their house with balloons and Laura cooks delicious meals, but no one shows up.

Laura gets drunk and quits her job. Then she goes to school to pick up her son but he is nowhere to be seen. She asks a policeman for help.

At the police station, a lady asks Laura to recall the accident that happened to her son last year. Laura says that she was out for groceries, and her husband was looking after their son, but Cody fell into the pool. When she came back he was still there, so she jumped in the pool and tried to save him and paramedics arrived. She insists that they revived her son and he was alright, then asks for water and leaves the police station.

When she gets home she finds Cody waiting for her there. He begs her to let him go as he should leave with the "pretty lady of the lake".

In reality her son died in the accident, but she was unable to cope with the grief and became delusional. The year is actually 2022, the 1950's world was one created in her own mind. She relents and allows her dead son to go with the "pretty lady in the lake" and achieves a degree of peace at last. Laura then frees herself from her delusion and leaves her house in California to return to her home.

Cast
 Christina Ricci as Laura
 Santino Barnard as Cody
 Colleen Camp as Mrs. Langtree
 Lew Temple as Mr. Alonzo 
 Nick Vallelonga as Legionnaire

Production
Principal photography began in early December 2020. Filming took place in Los Angeles, California, throughout Simi Valley, Sherman Oaks and Altadena. In March 2021, the cast was revealed at the Berlin International Film Festival. In March 2022, Screen Media acquired the distribution rights.

Release
Monstrous premiered in the FrightFest spotlight of the Glasgow Film Festival on March 12, 2022. It was released in theaters and on demand on May 13, 2022.

Reception
On the review aggregator website Rotten Tomatoes, the film has an approval rating of 56% based on 39 reviews, with an average rating of 5/10. The website's critical consensus reads, "Christina Ricci is capable of carrying a lot, but even her talents are tested by this often Monstrous-ly dull horror movie." Metacritic, which uses a weighted average, assigned a score of 52 out of 100 based on 10 critics, indicating "mixed or average reviews".

Anna Smith praised the performances, score, and soundtrack, writing: "Monstrous is one of those tricky films that play a little slowly, but invites a second viewing after the pay-off. Nonetheless, it’s a quietly thought-provoking watch that will resonate with those who connect to its themes."

References

External links
 

American horror films
American monster movies
American supernatural thriller films
Films about abuse
Films about families
Films set in California
Films shot in Los Angeles County, California
Films shot in Los Angeles
Films shot in Ventura County, California
2020s English-language films
2020s American films